The Women's 50 metre breaststroke competition of the 2022 FINA World Swimming Championships (25 m) was held on 17 and 18 December 2022.

Records
Prior to the competition, the existing world and championship records were as follows.

The following new records were set during this competition:

Results

Heats
The heats were started on 17 December at 12:36.

Semifinals
The semifinals were started on 17 December at 21:07.

Final
The final was held on 18 December at 19:49.

References

Women's 50 metre breaststroke
2022 in women's swimming